The 2022–23 season is Virtus Bologna's 94th in existence and the club's 6th consecutive season in the top flight of Italian basketball.

Kit 
Supplier: Macron / Sponsor: Segafredo

Players

Current roster

Depth chart

Squad changes

In

|}

Out

|}

Confirmed

|}

References 

2022–23 in Italian basketball by club
2022–23 EuroLeague by club